The Willis Independent School District is a public school district based in Willis, Texas, United States.

Located in Montgomery County, the district extends into a portion of San Jacinto County. The cities of Willis and Panorama Village and a small northern portion of the city of Conroe are within WISD.

For the 2018–2019 school year, the district received a B grade from the Texas Education Agency.

History
In 1881 the citizens of Willis, Texas contracted a college building. When final payments were made in 1884, the title was passed to Rev. and MRs. S. N. Barker, who opened Willis Male and Female College in September 1885.

In 1890, the location was sold to F.P. Crow and C.H. Stovall, who operated the college for 4 years.

In 1894 the college was briefly sold to Cyril M. Jansky and Marion Kiline before operations were returned to Crow.

The college was officially closed in 1901 after being sold to the public schools of Willis County.

Effective September 10, 1906, a public school was opened in the building, marking the beginning of the Willis Independent school District.

In 2001 three new board members took their positions.

In 2013, an individual sued the district in federal court, accusing it of ignoring a teacher sex abuse case.

Academics
For each school year, the Texas Education Agency rates school district performance using an A–F grading system based on statistical data. For 2018–2019, the district received a score of 85 out of 100, resulting in a B grade. The district received a score of 77 the previous year.

Schools

Secondary schools
Grades 9-12
Willis High School (Unincorporated Montgomery County)
Grades 6-8
Robert P. Brabham Middle School (Unincorporated Montgomery County)
Lynn Lucas Middle School (Unincorporated Montgomery County)

Primary schools
Grades K-5
Edward B. Cannan Elementary School (Willis)
C. C. Hardy Elementary School (Willis)
Mel Parmley Elementary School (Willis)
A. R. Turner Elementary School (Unincorporated Montgomery County)
William Lloyd Meador Elementary School (Willis)
Eddie Ruth Lagway Elementary School (Willis)

Other schools
Roark Early Education Center (Willis) – a school for Pre-kindergarten
Stubblefield Alternative Academy (Willis) – a Discipline Alternative Education Program

The district also participates in the Montgomery County JJAEP alternative education program, which is operated by Montgomery County in partnership with Conroe Independent School District.

References

Further reading

External links

Willis ISD

School districts in Montgomery County, Texas
School districts in San Jacinto County, Texas
Conroe, Texas